Emerald Tears is a solo album by bassist Dave Holland recorded in 1977 and released on the ECM label.

Reception
The Allmusic review by Joslyn Layne awarded the album 4 stars, stating, "Emerald Tears is a very nice showcase of Dave Holland, and is almost certain to be enjoyed by fans of the upright bass".

Track listing
All compositions by Dave Holland, except as indicated.
 "Sphere" - 5:58   
 "Emerald Tears" - 6:31   
 "Combination" - 5:18   
 "B-40/RS-4-W/M23-6K" (Anthony Braxton) - 5:15   
 "Under Redwoods" - 6:38   
 "Solar" (Miles Davis) - 6:17   
 "Flurries" - 4:34   
 "Hooveling" - 4:04
Recorded at Talent Studio in Oslo, Norway in August 1977

Personnel
David Holland — bass

References

External links

ECM Records albums
Dave Holland albums
1978 albums
Albums produced by Manfred Eicher